A spiral minaret is a feature of:

the Great Mosque of Samarra
the Mosque with the Spiral Minaret (Burmalı Mescit Camii), Istanbul